Harbert is both a surname and a given name. Notable people with the name include:

Surname:
Bill L. Harbert (1923–2010), American businessman
Chick Harbert (1915–1992), American golfer
Elizabeth Boynton Harbert (1843–1925), American author, lecturer, reformer, philanthropist
John M. Harbert (1921–1995), American businessman
Marguerite Harbert (1924–2015), American billionaire
Raymond J. Harbert (born 1958), American businessman and philanthropist.
Ted Harbert (born 1955), American television personality and chief executive
William Soesbe Harbert (1842–1919), American lawyer, judge, activist and philanthropist

See also
Harbert Management Corporation, American investment management company
Harbert Hills Academy, a school in Savannah, Tennessee
Harbert Landing, Mississippi, a ghost town in Mississippi